The Women's High Jump Competition at the 1988 Summer Olympics in Seoul, South Korea had an entry list of 24 competitors, with two qualifying groups (24 jumpers) before the final (12) took place on Friday September 30, 1988.

Records
These were the standing World and Olympic records (in metres) prior to the 1988 Summer Olympics.

The following Olympic record was set during this competition.

Results

Qualifying

Final

See also
 National champions high jump (women)
 1984 Women's Olympic High Jump (Los Angeles)
 1984 Women's Friendship Games High Jump (Prague)
 1986 Women's European Championships High Jump (Stuttgart)
 1987 Women's World Championships High Jump (Rome)
 1990 Women's European Championships High Jump (Split)
 1991 Women's World Championships High Jump (Tokyo)
 1992 Women's Olympic High Jump (Barcelona)

References

External links
  Official Report

 1
High jump at the Olympics
1988 in women's athletics
Women's events at the 1988 Summer Olympics